Jacinta Arianna Ruru  (born 1974) is a New Zealand academic and the first Māori professor of law. She was born in Australia and is of Raukawa, Ngāti Ranginui and Ngāti Maniapoto descent. Her mother and both maternal grand parents were English and Australian. Ruru is currently a professor at the University of Otago.

Academic career

Ruru completed a Master's at the University of Otago in 2001, with a thesis on the Treaty of Waitangi and national parks in New Zealand. After a 2012 Fulbright-funded PhD at the University of Victoria in Canada, Ruru returned to New Zealand and the University of Otago, rising to full professor in 2016.

Ruru's research centres on indigenous peoples' (primarily Māori in New Zealand and First Nations in Canada) legal relations with land and water. She is the co-director of Ngā Pae o te Māramatanga (NPM) the New Zealand's Māori Centre of Research Excellence (CoRE).

Recognition 
In addition to winning the Prime Minister's supreme award for tertiary teaching, Ruru has also been made a Fellow of the Royal Society of New Zealand. In 2017, Ruru was selected as one of the Royal Society Te Apārangi's "150 women in 150 words", celebrating the contributions of women to knowledge in New Zealand. In the same year she was invited to give the 10th Shirley Smith Memorial Address. Her speech was "First laws: tikanga Māori in / and the law".

In the 2022 New Year Honours, Ruru was appointed a Member of the New Zealand Order of Merit, for services to Māori and the law, and later that year received the University of Otago's Distinguished Research Medal.

Selected works 
 Ruru, Jacinta. (2004). "A politically fuelled tsunami: the foreshore/seabed controversy in Aotearoa Me Te Wai Pounamu/New Zealand." The Journal of the Polynesian Society 113, no. 1: 57–72.
 Miler, Robert J., and Jacinta Ruru. (2008). "An Indigenous Lens into Comparative Law: The Doctrine of Discovery in the United States and New Zealand." West Virginia Law Review 111: 849.
 Ruru, Jacinta. (2009). The legal voice of Māori in freshwater governance: a literature review. Landcare Research, New Zealand.
 Abbott, Mick, and Jacinta Ruru, eds. (2010). Beyond the scene: Landscape and identity in Aotearoa New Zealand. Otago University Press.
 Ruru, Jacinta. (2004). "Indigenous peoples' ownership and management of mountains: The Aotearoa/New Zealand experience." Indigenous Law Journal 3: 111–137.
Ruru, Jacinta, and Linda Waimarie Nikora, eds. (2021). Ngā Kete Mātauranga: Māori scholars at the research interface. Otago University Press. ISBN 978-1-98-859255-8

References

External links
 
 E-tangata interview

Living people
New Zealand women academics
Ngāti Raukawa people
Ngāti Ranginui people
Ngāti Maniapoto people
University of Victoria alumni
Academic staff of the University of Otago
Victoria University of Wellington alumni
University of Otago alumni
21st-century New Zealand lawyers
1974 births
New Zealand Māori academics
New Zealand Māori women academics
Members of the New Zealand Order of Merit
Fellows of the Royal Society of New Zealand